The women's pentathlon at the 1978 European Athletics Championships was held in Prague, Czechoslovakia (now in the Czech Republic), at Stadion Evžena Rošického on 1 and 2 September 1978.

Medalists

Results

Final
1/2 September

†: Nadiya Tkachenko ranked initially 1st (4744pts), but was disqualified for infringement of IAAF doping rules.
‡: Yekaterina Gordiyenko ranked initially 5th (4572pts), but was disqualified for infringement of IAAF doping rules.

Participation
According to an unofficial count, 21 athletes from 13 countries participated in the event.

 (1)
 (3)
 (1)
 (1)
 (2)
 (1)
 (1)
 (3)
 (1)
 (1)
 (2)
 (3)
 (1)

References

Pentathlon
Combined events at the European Athletics Championships
1978 in women's athletics